Burnaby-Deer Lake is a provincial electoral district in British Columbia, Canada established by the Electoral Districts Act, 2008.  It was first be contested in the 2009 general election in which New Democrat, Kathy Corrigan was elected its first MLA, and Anne Kang won the seat in 2017 after Corrigan decided not to run for re-election that year.

MLAs

Electoral history

References

External links
Burnaby-Deer Lake Electoral District Map (Redistribution 2008)
Elections BC Burnaby-Deer Lake (2017)

British Columbia provincial electoral districts
Politics of Burnaby
Provincial electoral districts in Greater Vancouver and the Fraser Valley